The Convention on the Safety of United Nations and Associated Personnel is a United Nations treaty that has the goal of protecting United Nations peacekeepers and other UN personnel.

Adoption
New Zealand and Ukraine proposed such a convention in 1993, and the International Law Commission drafted the convention in 1994. The United Nations General Assembly passed a resolution adopting the convention on 9 December 1994.

Content
Parties to the convention agree to criminalise the commission of murders or kidnappings of UN or association personnel as well as violent attacks against the equipment, official premises, private accommodation, or means of transport of such persons. Parties to the convention also agree to criminalise the attempted commission or threatened commission of such acts. "UN personnel" refers to individuals engaged or deployed by the UN Secretary-General as members of the military, police, or civilian components of a UN operation; it also includes officials of the UN specialized agencies and the International Atomic Energy Agency. "Associated personnel" includes other personnel—such as members of non-governmental organizations—assigned to act in an official capacity by UN personnel.

A central provision of the convention is the principle of aut dedere aut judicare—that a party to the treaty must either (1) prosecute a person who commits an offence against UN or associated personnel or (2) send the person to another state that requests his or her extradition for prosecution of the same crime.

The convention states that the military and police components of a UN operation—including vehicles, aircraft, and vessels—shall bear distinctive UN identification and that all UN and associated personnel shall carry appropriate identification. The treaty also states that the UN and associated personnel shall respect and abide by the domestic laws of the host state.

Ratifications and parties
By the end of 1995, the convention had been signed by 43 states and it came into force on 15 January 1999 after it had been ratified by 22 states. As of June 2016, the treaty has been ratified by 93 states, which includes 92 UN member states plus the State of Palestine. The states that signed the convention but have not yet ratified it are Haiti, Honduras, Malta, Pakistan, Sierra Leone, and the United States.

Optional Protocol
On 8 December 2005, the Optional Protocol to the Convention on the Safety of United Nations and Associated Personnel was adopted by the UN General Assembly. The Optional Protocol simply expands the scope of what constitutes a "UN operation" to include "delivering humanitarian, political or development assistance in peacebuilding" and "delivering emergency humanitarian assistance". The Optional Protocol was signed by 34 states, came into force on 19 August 2010, and as of June 2016 has been ratified by 30 states.

See also
Geneva Conventions and United Nations Personnel (Protocols) Act 2009

Notes

References
Ch. Bourloyannis-Vrailas, "The Convention on the Safety of United Nations and Associated Personnel", International and Comparative Law Quarterly, vol. 44 (1995) pp. 560–590.
E. T. Bloom, "Protecting Peacekeepers: The Convention on the Safety of United Nations and Associated Personnel", American Journal of International Law, vol. 89 (1995) pp. 621–631.
S. J. Lepper, "The Legal Status of Military Personnel in United Nations Peace Operations: One Delegate's Analysis", Houston Journal of International Law, vol. 18 (1995–1996) pp. 359–464.
H. Llewellyn, "The Optional Protocol to the 1994 Convention on the Safety of United Nations and Associated Personnel", International and Comparative Law Quarterly, vol. 55 (2006) pp. 718–728.

External links
Mahnoush H. Arsanjani, "Convention on the Safety of United Nations and Associated Personnel", un.org
Text of Convention.
Ratifications of Convention.
Text of Optional Protocol.
Ratifications of Optional Protocol.

Treaties concluded in 1994
Treaties entered into force in 1999
United Nations treaties
International criminal law treaties
United Nations peacekeeping
Convention
Treaties adopted by United Nations General Assembly resolutions
Treaties drafted by the International Law Commission
Treaties of Albania
Treaties of Argentina
Treaties of Australia
Treaties of Austria
Treaties of Azerbaijan
Treaties of Bangladesh
Treaties of Belarus
Treaties of Belgium
Treaties of Bolivia
Treaties of Bosnia and Herzegovina
Treaties of Botswana
Treaties of Brazil
Treaties of Brunei
Treaties of Bulgaria
Treaties of Burkina Faso
Treaties of Canada
Treaties of Chile
Treaties of the People's Republic of China
Treaties of Colombia
Treaties of Costa Rica
Treaties of Ivory Coast
Treaties of Croatia
Treaties of Cyprus
Treaties of the Czech Republic
Treaties of North Korea
Treaties of Denmark
Treaties of the Dominican Republic
Treaties of Ecuador
Treaties of El Salvador
Treaties of Estonia
Treaties of Fiji
Treaties of Finland
Treaties of France
Treaties of Germany
Treaties of Greece
Treaties of Guatemala
Treaties of Guinea
Treaties of Guyana
Treaties of Hungary
Treaties of Iceland
Treaties of Ireland
Treaties of Italy
Treaties of Jamaica
Treaties of Japan
Treaties of Kenya
Treaties of Kuwait
Treaties of Laos
Treaties of Lebanon
Treaties of Lesotho
Treaties of Liberia
Treaties of the Libyan Arab Jamahiriya
Treaties of Liechtenstein
Treaties of Lithuania
Treaties of Luxembourg
Treaties of Malawi
Treaties of Mali
Treaties of Monaco
Treaties of Mongolia
Treaties of Montenegro
Treaties of Nauru
Treaties of Nepal
Treaties of the Netherlands
Treaties of New Zealand
Treaties of Norway
Treaties of the State of Palestine
Treaties of Panama
Treaties of Paraguay
Treaties of the Philippines
Treaties of Poland
Treaties of Portugal
Treaties of South Korea
Treaties of Romania
Treaties of Russia
Treaties of Samoa
Treaties of Saudi Arabia
Treaties of Senegal
Treaties of Serbia and Montenegro
Treaties of Singapore
Treaties of Slovakia
Treaties of Slovenia
Treaties of Spain
Treaties of Sri Lanka
Treaties of Sweden
Treaties of Switzerland
Treaties of North Macedonia
Treaties of Togo
Treaties of Tunisia
Treaties of Turkey
Treaties of Turkmenistan
Treaties of Ukraine
Treaties of the United Kingdom
Treaties of Uruguay
Treaties of Uzbekistan
International humanitarian law treaties
Diplomatic immunity and protection treaties
Treaties extended to Aruba
Treaties extended to the Netherlands Antilles
Treaties extended to the Isle of Man
Treaties extended to the Faroe Islands
Treaties extended to Greenland
Treaties extended to Hong Kong
Treaties extended to Macau